Antežeriai ('a place on a lake', formerly) is a village in Kėdainiai district municipality, in Kaunas County, in central Lithuania. According to the 2011 census, the village had a population of 41 people. The Raguva rivulet passes through the village.

History
At the beginning of the 20th century there were Ambraziūnai village and estate.

Demography

Images

References

Villages in Kaunas County
Kėdainiai District Municipality